Biroba is a form of Hindu god Shiva. Biroba is the kuldaivat of Dhangars of Maharashtra State. There are many temples of Biroba in villages of Maharashtra. Also Karnataka in [Bijapura dist:] [taluk:Chadachan] Shiradon And also in Hunnur (taluk: Mangalwedha), Arewadi (Dist: Sangli), Katphal (taluk: :Sangola, Anusewadi in Atpadi, Pattankodoli, Pangari(Satara) there are temple of Biroba. Biroba is brother of Mayakka devi.

The god Mahalingraya or Mahalingeshwar is the student of Biroba (called Birling in Karnataka) and their temples are situated on the Maharashtra and Karnataka border in Huljanti. Festival (i.e. jatra in Marathi) of both gods is celebrated for five days from the first day of Hindu festival Diwali.

Temple of Biroba:
 Virbhadra Mandir, Sakur Mandhave, Sangamner, Ahemadnagar, Maharashtra
 Biroba mandir, Arewadi, Kavthe mahankal, Sangli
 Vitthal-Birdev mandir, Pattankodoli, hatkangle, Kolhapur
 Biroba mandir, Hunnur.
 Mahalingraya-Biroba mandir, Huljanti, Mangalvedha, Solapur
 Birdev mandir, Salape, Phaltan, Satara
 Satoba-Biroba mandir, Takewadi, Man, Satara

See also
Beerappa

References

Regional Hindu gods
Forms of Shiva